Microplophorus is a genus of beetles in the family Cerambycidae, containing the following species:

 Microplophorus calverti Philippi in Germain, 1897
 Microplophorus magellanicus Blanchard in Gay, 1851
 Microplophorus penai Galileo, 1987

References

Prioninae